Clarence Adler (1886-1969) was an American musician from Cincinnati, Ohio. He was a pianist, and a soloist for many leading orchestras in the United States and abroad. He was the private music instructor for composer Aaron Copland.

Adler was born in Cincinnati to German Jewish immigrants. He won a scholarship to the College of Music of Cincinnati (later part of UC's CCM) at age 12. After he turned 18 he went to Europe for further study and found success and acclaim as the pianist in a famous trio. He returned to Cincinnati and continued his ensemble endeavors.

In 1913 he moved to New York City and taught at the Institute of Musical Art (later part of Juilliard) and gave over 60 private lessons a week, influencing the lives of many musicians. In addition to Aaron Copland, Adler taught Walter Hendl, Richard Rodgers, and Hazel Ghazarian Skaggs. He formed a music colony at Lake Placid, NY which acted as a retreat, teaching center, and concert venue for 40 years.

The College of Music of Cincinnati awarded Adler an honorary doctorate for his dedication.

References

External links

1886 births
1969 deaths
American people of German-Jewish descent
American pianists
People from Cincinnati
American male pianists
20th-century American male musicians
20th-century American pianists